Second Baptist Church is a historic Baptist church located at 4th St. and Broadway in Columbia, Missouri. It was built in 1894, and has Gothic Revival and Romanesque Revival design elements.  The church was founded by newly emancipated slaves many of whom were members of First Baptist Church.

It was added to the National Register of Historic Places in 1980.

References

Churches on the National Register of Historic Places in Missouri
Gothic Revival church buildings in Missouri
Romanesque Revival church buildings in Missouri
Churches completed in 1894
Baptist churches in Missouri
Churches in Columbia, Missouri
National Register of Historic Places in Boone County, Missouri
African-American history of Missouri
African-American history in Columbia, Missouri